Route 189 is a  state route in the U.S. states of Connecticut and Massachusetts. The route begins in the northwestern portion of the Connecticut state capital of Hartford and ends in the rural town of Granville. In Massachusetts, the route is not a state highway and is maintained by the town of Granville.

Route description

Route 189 begins at an intersection with US 44 in western Hartford and heads northwest, crossing into West Hartford.  It passes the University of Hartford and the eastern end of Route 185, continuing northwest across the northeastern corner of West Hartford and crossing into Bloomfield.  In Bloomfield, it continues north, crossing Route 218, and passes through the center of town where it intersects Route 178.  North of town, it turns slightly northeast, and meets Route 187 to form a short freeway.  After Route 187 leaves to the north, the freeway continues briefly, then downgrades to a 2 lane primary arterial road as it crosses into Simsbury.  In Simsbury, it enters the Tariffville section of town, where it meets the eastern end of Route 315 before crossing the Farmington River into East Granby.  In East Granby, it continues northwest to Granby.  In Granby, it continues northwest, briefly overlapping US 202 and Route 10, immediately followed by a brief overlap with Route 20.  It then continues northwest across the northwest portion of town, and crosses the Massachusetts state line into the town of Granville, ending at an intersection with Route 57 in the town center.

History
The route from Granby center northwest through North Granby to the Massachusetts state line was designated in 1922 as State Highway 206. In the 1932 state highway renumbering, Route 189 was established as a new designation for old Highway 206. It originally ran from Route 20 in Granby to the state line. At the same time, Massachusetts designated the continuation as Route 189 in Granville to Route 57. The portion south of Route 20 was, at the time, designated as part of Route 9. Before 1932, this portion was still part of New England Route 10. The original Route 9 in Bloomfield followed Tunxis Avenue into Tariffville before continuing north along Hartford Avenue, crossing the Farmington River three times in the process. In 1960, five years after two of the bridges were washed out in a flood, Route 9 was relocated to stay on the south side of the river along a newly built expressway. In 1963, with the opening of the Route 9 freeway south of Hartford, the section of Route 9 from US 44 in Hartford to Route 20 in Granby was reassigned as a southern extension of Route 189.

Major intersections

References

189
Transportation in Hartford County, Connecticut
189